USS Sierra has been the name of more than one United States Navy ship, and may refer to:

 , a troop transport in commission from 1918 to 1919
 , a destroyer tender in commission from 1944 to 1994

United States Navy ship names